The Mississippi State Bulldogs baseball team is the varsity intercollegiate baseball team representing Mississippi State University in NCAA Division I college baseball. The program is a member of the West Division of the Southeastern Conference (SEC). The current head coach is Chris Lemonis. They have appeared in the College World Series 12 times, winning their first national championship in their most recent appearance in 2021.

History
Mississippi State has won 11 SEC Championships in 1948, 1949, 1965, 1966, 1970, 1971, 1979, 1985, 1987, 1989, and 2016. The first six were won in a playoff series (with the first two being best-of-five while the rest were a best-of-three series). Since the formation of the SEC Tournament in 1977, the Bulldogs have won it seven times, in 1979, 1985, 1987, 1990, 2001, 2005, and 2012. The seven tournament championships and six playoff championships are a total of 13 SEC postseason championships, the most of any school.

Prior to the formation of the SEC, the program won the Southern Intercollegiate Athletic Association championship in 1909, 1911, 1918, 1921, and 1922 as well as the Southern Conference title in 1924.

The program has also appeared in 34 NCAA Regionals and 12 College World Series. Out of its 12 College World Series trips, the program has appeared in two national championship series (2013 and 2021).  Eight years after finishing as runner-up to the UCLA Bruins in 2013, the Mississippi State Bulldogs returned to the national championship series when on June 30, 2021, the club defeated the Vanderbilt Commodores with a score of 9–0 to finally secure its first National Championship title, which serves as the first national championship in a team-sport in school history. This 2021 National Championship was earned in a third consecutive trip to the College World Series (2018, 2019, 2021).

A Bulldogs pitcher was selected in the first round of the MLB draft 6 times.

 *2020 College World Series did not take place due to the cancellation of the 2020 college baseball season in the presence of the COVID-19 Pandemic. The team had achieved a 12–4 record to start the 2020 season before it was discontinued during March 2020.

Venue

The Bulldogs play their home games at Dudy Noble Field, Polk-DeMent Stadium. Dubbed the "Carnegie Hall of College Baseball" by Nelle Cohen, wife of former MSU skipper and current Athletic Director John Cohen, it was the host site of the first SEC tournament and holds the NCAA baseball on-campus attendance record of 15,586 spectators, set in a game against the University of Mississippi in 2014. The stadium has hosted 23 of the top 25 largest crowds to attend an on-campus college baseball game, which the top 10 belong solely to Mississippi State. In 2013, Paul Swaney of Stadium Journey ranked it as the number one collegiate ballpark. One of the venue's most prominent features is the Left Field Lounge, an outfield area where spectators can gather and enjoy the games in a tailgate setting, including stands built on top of old pick-up trucks and trailers.

In 2005, the Palmeiro Center, a  indoor practice facility, was built next to Dudy Noble. The facility, made possible by a gift from program alumnus Rafael Palmeiro and his wife Lynne, features an infield practice area, additional training area, and three batting cages. A baseball coaches' office complex located between the Palmeiro Center and Dudy Noble Field was also built in 2005. The complex, which includes a baseball heritage room, was made possible by contributions from former Bulldog players Jeff Brantley, Will Clark, Eric DuBose, Paul Maholm, Jay Powell and Bobby Thigpen, along with sports agent and former Bulldog manager Bo McKinnis.

Attendance

The program has set many attendance records at Dudy Noble Field. SEC and Super Regional weekend games usually draw the largest crowds to Dudy Noble Field. Mississippi State currently holds the NCAA record for the largest single game on-campus baseball attendance at 15,586 and the largest regular season crowd for a 3-game weekend series at 39,181. In 2021, in a Super Regional against Notre Dame, Mississippi State set NCAA attendance records for Super Regional games with 14,385 and 13,971 fans and a record total for a 3-game series of 40,140. More than 5 million spectators have attended games at the venue since the university started tracking attendance numbers in 1976.
Mississippi State holds all of the top 10 and 23 of the top 25 on-campus crowds in college baseball history, including 14 crowds of over 12,000 and 42 crowds of over 10,000.

Shown below are the 10 largest home crowds in Mississippi State history. Note that nine of these crowds are among the NCAA's 10 largest ever on-campus crowds.

MLB First Round Draft Picks
* 1st round of the 2007 MLB Supplemental Draft 
** Taken in the Competitive Balance 1st round of the 2017 MLB Draft 

*** Taken in the Competitive Balance 1st round in the 2022 MLB Draft

Mississippi State's 1st Team All-Americans

Ron Polk Ring of Honor
2019 Class
Jeff Brantley
Will Clark
Dave Ferriss
Dudy Noble
Rafael Palmeiro

2020 Class
Eric Dubose
Paul Gregory
Bobby Thigpen

2021 Class
Paul Maholm
Jonathan Papelbon
Jay Powell
Del Unser

2022 Class
Richard Lee
Pete Young
Frank Montgomery

Individual awards

National awards
Baseball America Freshman of the Year Award
Rafael Palmeiro (1983)
Golden Spikes Award
Will Clark (1985)
Baseball America College Coach of the Year
Ron Polk (1985)
Johnny Bench Award
Ed Easley (2007)
Collegiate Baseball Player of the Year Award
Brent Rooker (2017)
NCBWA National Coach of the Year
Gary Henderson (2018)
Rawlings Coach of the Year
Gary Henderson (2018)
Baseball America College Coach of the Year
Chris Lemonis (2021)

Notable players

Jeff Brantley
Will Clark
John Cohen
Hughie Critz
Ed Easley
Dave "Boo" Ferriss
Adam Frazier
Alex Grammas
Kendall Graveman
Jonathan Holder
Dakota Hudson
Morley Jennings
Jon Knott
Jack Lazorko
Nate Lowe
Paul Maholm
Tyler Moore
Mitch Moreland
Buddy Myer
Bob Myrick
Dudy Noble
Rafael Palmeiro
Jonathan Papelbon
Jay Powell
Hunter Renfroe
Buck Showalter
Chris Stratton
Craig Tatum
Bobby Thigpen
Del Unser
Brandon Woodruff
Chris Young

Coaches
Only those who coached 3 or more seasons and 30 or more games.

† There was no SEC Baseball Tournament before 1977. Records are for the two team playoff that determined the SEC champion.

Year-by-year results

†NCAA canceled all postseason activities for all college sports due to the COVID-19 virus.

50 Win Seasons

† Does not include SEC Tourney Record 
†† Division Champ

All-time record vs. SEC teams

Rivalries

In baseball, MSU has two main rivals, LSU and Ole Miss.

Against LSU, the Bulldogs hold a 216–185 all-time series lead over LSU in a series that got its start in 1907.

Against Ole Miss, Mississippi State leads the series 259–208–5. Retired Mississippi State head baseball coach, Ron Polk, was 85–49 against Ole Miss. John Cohen, MSU's former coach, was 8–11 in SEC Conference games and 11–17 overall against Ole Miss. Andy Cannizaro was 4–0 against Ole Miss in 2017. Gary Henderson was 3–1 against Mississippi in 2018, while MSU's current coach Chris Lemonis has a 6–1 mark. The two teams play a 3-game series each year that counts in the SEC standings and one non-conference game in Jackson, MS. The game in Jackson was called the Mayor's Trophy from 1980 to 2006, and from 2007 to present the game has been called the Governor's Cup. The Mayor's Trophy series ended 14–13 in favor of the Rebels. With the 2007 season, the non-conference meeting between the two teams moved to Trustmark Park in Pearl, Mississippi – which is the home to the Mississippi Braves. Mississippi State holds the lead in the Governor's Cup 9–4.

See also
List of NCAA Division I baseball programs

References

External links
SECSports.com All-Time SEC Baseball Tournament Results
Mississippi State Baseball Medi
Boyd's World Data
Ron Polk Bio
Pat McMahon Bio
2013 Mississippi State Universality baseball Media Guide
Left Field Lounge News
What is the Left Field Lounge by John Grisham

External links
 

 
Baseball teams established in 1885
1885 establishments in Mississippi